Yangdŏk County is a kun (county) in South P'yŏngan province, North Korea.

History
The region is thought to be near the ancient chiefdom of dongye. Biryuguk used to be in the region.
It was incorporated into Goguryeo around 40 BC.

Climate

Administrative divisions
Yangdŏk County is divided into one ŭp (town) and 18 ri (villages):

Transportation
Yangdŏk county is served by Yangdŏk Station on the Korean State Railway's P'yŏngra Line.

Yangdok Hot Springs Tourist Area
In 2019, Yangdok Hot Springs Tourist Area was a key construction project, built on the site of Yangdok Recreation Center which opened in 1947. It was opened by Kim Jong-un on 7 December 2019. It featured indoor and outdoor baths, a ski slope, and a horse-riding park.

References

External links
  Map of Pyongan provinces
  Detailed map

Counties of South Pyongan